The DHR B Class is a famous class of  gauge  saddle tank steam locomotives used on the Darjeeling Himalayan Railway (DHR) in West Bengal, India.

Service history
A total of 34 B Class locomotives have served on the DHR.  Some are still on the working roster.  One, no. 778, was sold for private preservation, and four others were sold to Coal India, Assam.  The remaining class members have been either plinthed in various locations in northern India, or scrapped. Of the few in active service, the locomotives 788 'Tusker' and 'Victor' haul trains between Darjeeling to Ghum stations via Batasia loop, quite a few times a day.  Another loco, DHR 780 is kept preserved with two narrow gauge coaches at Eco Park, Rajarhat, as an exhibit.

Livery
Initially, all members of the class were liveried in DHR green.  For a short period at the end of World War II, they were repainted black.  Later, they ran in an unlined red colour. Since coming under the control of the Northeast Frontier Railway in 1958, they have been painted Caledonian blue with white lining.

See also

Rail transport in India#History
Indian Railways
Locomotives of India
Rail transport in India

References

Notes

Bibliography

External links

Baldwin locomotives
NBL locomotives
Railway locomotives introduced in 1889
Steam locomotives of India
Sharp Stewart locomotives
0-4-0ST locomotives
2 ft gauge locomotives